Pari Lake is located approximately  above sea level, in the mountain ranges of Utror Valley, Kalam, Swat Valley, Khyber Pakhtunkhwa, Pakistan. It is comparatively greater in size and depth than the other lake situated in its vicinity and remains open in the months of July till September. The western face of the lake is open and its water flows down to the gigantic Kundol Lake which is situated in the foothills. There are in fact two lakes that share the common name and are sometimes referred to as lake 1 and lake 2. 

The name pari or Khapiro is given to this lake because of the belief that this lake is the house of fairies, where they reside and bathe in the pure, cool and clear water of the lake. To the North east of the Utror Valley this lake is situated and one can get access there by trekking. This trek is very dangerous and frustrating, the way is narrow bends and turns So, more care should be taken.

See also
Kundol Lake
Mahodand Lake
Saidgai Lake

References

Lakes of Khyber Pakhtunkhwa
Tourist attractions in Swat
Swat District